Brezovo Brdo is a small village in the Municipality of Hrpelje-Kozina in the Littoral region of Slovenia.

The local church is dedicated to Saints Peter and Paul and belongs to the Parish of Pregarje.

References

External links
Brezovo Brdo on Geopedia

Populated places in the Municipality of Hrpelje-Kozina